Maqtu-e Sofla (also Romanized as Maqţū‘-e Soflá; also known as Maqţū‘-e Pā’īn) is a village in Jarahi Rural District, in the Central District of Mahshahr County, Khuzestan Province, Iran. At the 2006 census, its population was 238, in 52 families.

References 

Populated places in Mahshahr County